Jacob Hendrik Smit, CMG (3 September 1881 – 22 July 1959) was a Southern Rhodesian merchant and politician. Born in the Netherlands, Smit migrated to Rhodesia and traded as a merchant, before becoming Southern Rhodesia's Minister of Finance in 1933. Orthodox in his economic policies, Smit resigned from Godfrey Huggins' government in 1942 and later formed the right-wing Liberal Party. He was Southern Rhodesia's Leader of the Opposition from 1946 to 1948, when he lost his seat.

Biography 
Smit was born in Hilversum, the Netherlands, the son of Samuel Marinus Smit and Aleyda Woutera van Wyland. Destined for a teaching career, he instead became a bank clerk, before migrating to the Transvaal around 1899. Failing to establish himself there, he went to Beira in 1900, working as a tobacconist, and thence to Salisbury in 1905, where at first he sold wares from a barrow, then a mule cart. Opening a grocery and hardware store in 1914, Smit's fortunes rose, and he became first a town councillor, then the Mayor of Salisbury from 1927 to 1928. He was naturalised as a British subject in 1926.

In 1931, Smit was elected to the Southern Rhodesian Legislative Assembly in a surprise anti-government by-election victory in Salisbury South, and in 1932 he joined the Reform Party. When Godfrey Huggins formed a government in 1933, Smit was appointed Minister of Finance, becoming Minister of Finance and Commerce in 1934. As Minister of Finance, Smit introduced a state lottery and a new customs policy: being a strong supporter of the imperial connection with the United Kingdom, he favoured stronger trading links with the UK rather than South Africa. A strong believer in orthodox economics, Smit was opposed to the running of unbalanced budgets during his time in office. Smit was appointed a Companion of the Order of St Michael and St George (CMG) in the 1939 Birthday Honours.

Smit continued in office in Huggins' wartime coalition government, but increasingly came to disagree with Huggins on various issues, in particular what he perceived as Huggins' willingness to entertain left-wing wartime economic policies. Another factor behind the drift was Huggins' failure to include him in his exclusive wartime Defence Committee.

In January 1942, Smit tendered his resignation from the Huggins government. He became the leader of the newly formed Southern Rhodesia Liberal Party in 1943. The Liberal Party attempted to unite conservative, non-trade union opposition to the United Party while opposing government economic regulation and the advancement of Black political interests. It supported dominion status for Southern Rhodesia and opposed amalgamation with Northern Rhodesia.

Smit became the Leader of the Opposition following the 1946 Southern Rhodesian general election, in which his party won 12 seats. He lost his seat in the 1948 Southern Rhodesian general election, in which the Liberal Party was reduced to a rump of five. Some blamed his defeat on the public's mistaken impression that Smit was an Afrikaner, which associated him and his party with the Nationalist Party in South Africa in the public mind.

Family 
Jacob Smit married Dieta Smilda in 1913. They had one son, Captain John Walter Smit, 3rd Bn Gold Coast Regiment, RWAFF, who was killed in Burma in 1944.

References 
 T. W. Baxter and E. E. Burke, Guide to the historical manuscripts in the National Archives of Rhodesia
Robert Blake, A History of Rhodesia
L. H. Gann and M. Gelfand, Huggins of Rhodesia: The Man and His Country

1881 births
1959 deaths
Dutch emigrants
People from Hilversum
Emigrants from the Netherlands to Southern Rhodesia
Zimbabwean people of Dutch descent
Companions of the Order of St Michael and St George
Finance ministers of Rhodesia
Members of the Legislative Assembly of Southern Rhodesia
White Rhodesian people